Kotobabi is a town in the Accra Metropolitan district, a district of the Greater Accra Region of Ghana.
It has a police station which serves suburbs in Accra like Roman Ridge, Pig Farm, Alajo, Maamobi, Kokomlemle, Alajo, Kpehe, Dzorwulu, Roman Ridge, Abelemkpe and Accra Newtown.

References

Populated places in the Greater Accra Region